Iska's Journey  is a 2007 Hungarian film directed by Csaba Bollók and stars newcomer Mária Varga.

Synopsis 
The film is the result of director Bollók's accidental meeting with a 14-year-old street child, Maria Varga, living in a coal mining town of the Southern Carpathians.  The story follows her journey from her small town to the Black Sea, where she becomes a victim of human trafficking.

Distribution and response 

The film was first screened in February 2007 at the Hungarian Film Festival, where it ended up as the surprise winner of the Grand Prize. After its international premier at the Berlinale in 2007, Iska's Journey was received on the international festival circuit as a huge success. More than 50 European, Asian, and American film festivals have presented Bollók's feature to date. Following its North American premier in Seattle last year, Iska's Journey was presented in Chicago, Cleveland, Toronto, Palm Springs and Vancouver.

It was commercially released in Hungary on 22 November 2007. The film was chosen as Hungary's official submission to the 81st Academy Awards for Best Foreign Language Film.

References

External links 
 
 Iska's Journey Trailer
 

2007 films
Hungarian drama films